Eduard Adrian Pap (born 1 July 1994) is a Romanian professional footballer who plays for Liga I side FC Botoșani as a goalkeeper.

Club career
Pap made his debut in professional football against UTA Arad, in 2013. He went on to keep a clean sheet in his first Liga I match, facing CFR Cluj.

Honours
ACS Poli Timișoara
Liga II: 2014–15

Luceafărul Oradea
Liga III: 2015–16

References

External links
 
 

People from Jimbolia
Living people
1994 births
Romanian footballers
Romania youth international footballers
Association football goalkeepers
Liga I players
Liga II players
Liga III players
ACS Poli Timișoara players
CS Luceafărul Oradea players
ASA 2013 Târgu Mureș players
FC Botoșani players